Christopher Andreas Holmboe (19 March 1796– 2 April 1882) was a Norwegian philologist, orientalist and numismatist.

Holmboe was born at Vang in Oppland, Norway. He was son of parish priest Jens Holmboe  and brother of mathematician Bernt Michael Holmboe.   He attended the Oslo Cathedral School and graduated as cand.theol. in 1818. He was professor of oriental languages at the University of Christiania (now University of Oslo) from 1825 to 1876. He also served as warden of the University Coin Cabinet.

See also
Holmboe (family)

References

1796 births
1882 deaths
People from Vang, Oppland
 People educated at Oslo Cathedral School
Norwegian orientalists
Norwegian philologists
Norwegian numismatists
Academic staff of the University of Oslo
Christopher Andreas